Isola is a village in Tuscany, central Italy, administratively a frazione of the comune of San Miniato, province of Pisa. At the time of the 2001 census its population was 536.

Isola is about 52 km from Pisa and 4 km from San Miniato.

References 

Frazioni of the Province of Pisa